Pedro Henrique Gicca (born August 28, 1987) is a Brazilian model who gained popularity when he became the first Brazilian to win the Mister Global competition in 2017.

Early life 
Pedro was born in Mogi das Cruzes, São Paulo. He is of Italian descent and holds a degree in electrical engineering.

Career 
Gicca began modeling at age 24 when he posted photos of rehearsals on his social networks and was invited to join the casting of some modeling agencies. After participating in the Mister Brazil national contest, he joined the fixed cast of the Conexão Models program, at Rede TV.

He appeared on television, on Pânico na Band, Roda a Roda Jequiti and Luciana by Night, as well as a story about his preparation for Mister Brazil.

Mister Brazil 
His second contest was Mister Brasil 2015, representing the Alto Tietê region. In the competition, Gicca took 14th place.

Mister Global 2017 
In 2016 was invited by the organization of Henrique Fontes to represent Brazil in the fourth edition of Mister Global, after the retirement of the gaucho William Severo. For this competition, he received two weeks of special training in Taquari, Rio Grande do Sul, where he perfected his skills on the catwalk, received behavior classes, aesthetic treatments and body care.

He was considered the favorite by forums and websites specializing in international beauty contests. Pedro did win, while South African Gerrie Havenga and Englishman Christopher Bramell came second and third respectively.

References

External links
 

1987 births
Living people
People from Mogi das Cruzes
Brazilian people of Italian descent
Brazilian male models
Brazilian beauty pageant winners
Male beauty pageant winners
Mister Global winners
Mister Global contestants